Substrate may refer to:

Physical layers

Substrate (biology), the natural environment in which an organism lives, or the surface or medium on which an organism grows or is attached
Substrate (locomotion), the surface over which an organism locomotes
Substrate (marine biology), the earthy material that exists in the bottom of a marine habitat, like dirt, rocks, sand, or gravel
Substrate (building), natural stone, masonry surface, ceramic and porcelain tiles
Substrate (chemistry), the reactant which is consumed during a catalytic or enzymatic reaction
Substrate (biochemistry), a molecule that is acted upon by an enzyme
Substrate (materials science), the material on which a process is conducted
Substrate (printing), the base material that images will be printed onto
Substrate (vivarium), the material used in the bottom of a vivarium or terrarium
Substrate (aquarium), the material used in the bottom of an aquarium
Printed circuit board (PCB), or more specifically, the electrically insulating portion of a PCB structure, such as fiberglass bound together with epoxy cement
Stratum on which another geologic stratum lies
Wafer (electronics), also called a substrate

Other uses
Substratum (linguistics), in linguistics, a language that influences but is supplanted by a second language
Neural substrate, in neuroscience, the set of brain structures that underlies a specific behavior or psychological state

See also
Substrata (disambiguation)
Monism, for the concept of the universal substrate in philosophy
Reagent
Reactant
Subjectile
Superstrate